The 2006 Under-16 European Promotion Cup for Women was the fourth edition of the basketball European Promotion Cup for U16 women's teams, today known as FIBA U16 Women's European Championship Division C. It was played in Kirchberg, Luxembourg, from 11 to 16 July 2006. Scotland women's national under-16 basketball team won the tournament.

Participating teams

First round

Playoffs

Final standings

References

2006
2006–07 in European women's basketball
FIBA U16
Sports competitions in Luxembourg
FIBA